William C. Farr (March 13, 1844 – February 14, 1921) was the fifth Mayor of Bayonne, New Jersey, from 1891 to 1895.

Biography
Born on March 13, 1844, in Gettenbach, an old (since 1252), but small village in a large forest Buedinger Wald, former district Kreis Gelnhausen, former province Provinz Hanau, former state Kurhessen, near Frankfurt-am-Main, in Germany, Farr immigrated to the United States in 1861. After arriving in Baltimore, Farr moved to Bayonne in 1862. On May 31, 1863, he married Mary Dorethea Schmidt; they had five children together. After a time operating a canal boat, Farr became successful in business running a contracting firm in Bayonne.

A Republican, he was nominated by both the Democratic Party and the Independent Party and was elected mayor of Bayonne, defeating incumbent Republican mayor John Newman in a highly contested election in 1891. Farr, who received the nomination of both the Democrats and the Republicans in 1893, easily won a second term. In Farr's two terms as mayor, he was instrumental in bringing water and electricity to Bayonne. Nominated for a third term in 1895, he lost to the Democrat Egbert Seymour in 1895. Farr retired from business a wealthy man. He donated money to a number of charities including the German Lutheran Hospital in Manhattan, New York City.

Farr died on February 14, 1921, in his home at age 77 of influenza. He is buried in Moravian Cemetery on Staten Island. Coincidentally, Seymour, his successor, had also died of influenza only eight days before.

References

External links
 

1841 births
1921 deaths
Hessian emigrants to the United States
Mayors of Bayonne, New Jersey
Deaths from influenza
Infectious disease deaths in New Jersey
New Jersey Republicans
Burials at Moravian Cemetery